Orgnac is part of the name of several communes in France:

 Orgnac-l'Aven, a commune in the Ardèche department
 Orgnac-sur-Vézère, a commune in the Corrèze department